Tughlaq Tamar Khan was the governor of Oudh and Bengal during the reign of Sultan Aluddin Masud Shah.

History
The Province of Bengal, under the governorship of Tughral Tughan Khan, was invaded by Odia armies in the year 1241. After the Province was overrun, the Sultanate Governor of Oudh, Tughlaq Tamar Khan, was appointed to lead a relief army to Bengal to aid Tughan Khan however at Darbhanga on the border of Bengal and Bihar, the Tamar Khan attempted to depose Tughan Khan himself.

Though unable to slay his rival, Tamar Khan was able to drive him from the Province and gain control of both the Sultanate armies of Bengal and Oudh by bribing the remaining generals. In 1246, Tamar Khan finally entered Bengal where, aided by a revolt of local Zamindars, he was able to take control of the old capital of Devkot. However his attempts to rebuild the Navy were defeated.

At the Siege of Lakhnauti, formerly sacked by the Odia armies in 1242, Tamar Khan's forces was repelled. In 1247 Tamar Khan died of a fever upon which North Bengal was reconquered by the Odia general, Paramardi Dev. Tamar Khan's death would lead to the appointment of lkhtiyar-ud-Din Yuzbak as Governor of Bengal, which would lead to the rebellion of Tughan Khan in 1272 CE.

See also
List of rulers of Bengal
History of Bengal
History of Bangladesh
History of India

References

Governors of Bengal
Awadh
13th-century Indian monarchs
13th-century Indian Muslims
1247 deaths
Year of birth unknown